Per Axel Rydberg (July 6, 1860 – July 25, 1931) was a Swedish-born, American botanist who was  the first curator of the New York Botanical Garden Herbarium.

Biography
Per Axel Rydberg was born in Odh, Västergötland, Sweden and emigrated to the United States in 1882.  From 1884 to 1890, he taught mathematics at Luther Academy in Wahoo, Nebraska, while he studied at the University of Nebraska. He graduated from the University of Nebraska–Lincoln (B.S. in 1891) and (M.A. in 1895). He earned his graduate degree from Columbia University (Ph.D. in 1898).  

After he graduated, Rydberg received a commission from the United States Department of Agriculture to undertake a botanical exploration of western Nebraska. He received another one in 1892 to explore the Black Hills of South Dakota, and in 1893 he was in the Sand Hills, again in western Nebraska. During this time he continued to teach at the Luther Academy. 

In 1900 Rydberg conducted field work in southeast Colorado. In 1901 he visited Kew Gardens in England and made a return trip to Sweden as well. In 1905 he was collecting in Utah with visits to the University of Wyoming, Los Angeles, and San Francisco. In 1911 he undertook an exploration of southeast Utah and in 1925, the Allegheny Mountains. A trip in 1926 took him to Minnesota, Iowa, Nebraska, Kansas, and the Dakotas. His final field expedition was in 1929 to Kansas and Minnesota but it was cut short due to illness and only included work in Kansas.

He was a prolific research publisher, he described around 1700 new species in the course of his career.  His expertise was principally in the flora of the Great Plains and Rocky Mountains. From 1899, Rydberg was on the staff of the New York Botanical Garden, and he later became the first curator of the Garden's Herbarium.

Dr. Rydberg was elected to membership in the Torrey Botanical Club in 1896. In 1900 he joined the American Association for the Advancement of Science and was elected a fellow the following year. Also that year, he was chosen as an Associate of the Botanical Society of America. In 1907 he became a member of the American Geographical Society and the Ecological Society of America.

Personal life
Rydberg married his wife Alfrida Amanda	(1878-1933).
Rydberg died during 1931 in New York City. He was buried at the Woodlawn Cemetery.

Selected works
1895: Flora Of The Sand Hills Of Nebraska 
1897: A Report Upon the Grasses and Forage Plants of the Rocky Mountain Region with C. L. Shear
1898: A Monograph of the North American Potentilleae 
1900: Catalogue of the Flora of Montana and the Yellowstone National Park
1906: Flora of Colorado
1917: Flora of the Rocky Mountains and adjacent plains, Colorado, Utah, Wyoming, Idaho, Montana, Saskatchewan, Alberta, and neighboring parts of Nebraska, South Dakota, and British Columbia
1922: Flora of the Rocky Mountains and adjacent plains, Colorado, Utah, Wyoming, Idaho, Montana, Saskatchewan, Alberta, and neighboring parts of Nebraska, South Dakota, North Dakota, and British Columbia
1918:  Monograph on Rosa
1923: Flora of the Black Hills of South Dakota
1923: Memories from the Department of Botany of Columbia University 
1932: Flora of the Prairies and Plains of Central North America with M. A. Howe

Other works
1901: Contributions to the botany of the Yukon Territory, (with Nathaniel Lord Britton, Marshall A. Howe, Lucien Marcus Underwood, and R. S. Williams)
1903: Flora of the southeastern United States;being descriptions of the seed-plants, ferns and fern-allies growing naturally in North Carolina, South Carolina, Georgia, Florida, Tennessee, Alabama, Mississippi, Arkansas, Louisiana and the Indian territory and in Oklahoma and Texas east of the one-hundredth meridian,(with John Kunkel Small)
1919: Key to the Rocky Mountain flora; Colorado, Utah, Wyoming, Idaho, Montana, Saskatchewan, Alberta, and parts of Nebraska, South Dakota, North Dakota, and British Columbia.
1899-1913: Studies on Rocky Mountain flora.  (Series: Contributions from the New York Botanical Garden)

References

Other sources
Tiehm, Arnold; Frans Antonie Stafleu (1990) Per Axel Rydberg : a biography, bibliography, and list of his taxa (Bronx, N.Y.: New York Botanical Garden)

Related reading 
Benson, Adolph B.; Naboth Hedin (1969) Swedes In America (New York: Haskel House Publishers)

External links
 
Brief biography on the website of Western Kentucky University

1860 births
1931 deaths
University of Nebraska–Lincoln alumni
Columbia University alumni
American botanists
Botanists with author abbreviations
Swedish emigrants to the United States
People from Västergötland
Torrey Botanical Society members